A Distant Neighborhood is a 2010 internationally co-produced fantasy film directed by Sam Garbarski. The screenplay, written by Garbarski alongside Jérôme Tonnerre and Philippe Blasband, was based on the manga of the same name by Jiro Taniguchi. The film stars Pascal Greggory, Jonathan Zaccaï, Alexandra Maria Lara and Léo Legrand, with Évelyne Didi, Lionel Abelanski and Tania Garbarski in supporting roles.

The film tells the story of Thomas Verniaz, a middle-aged family man who accidentally takes a train ride back to his old hometown and visits his mother's grave. Thomas is then transported back in time, and discovers that he's a teenager again, but with all of his adult memories intact.

A Distant Neighborhood was met with mostly positive reviews, with critics commending its faithfulness to the source material and the performances of its cast, particularly Zaccaï and Legrand. It received five nominations at the 2011 Magritte Awards, including Best Director for Garbarski, and went on to win Best Production Design for Véronique Sacrez.

Cast 
 Pascal Greggory as Thomas Verniaz
 Jonathan Zaccaï as Bruno Verniaz
 Alexandra Maria Lara as Anna Verniaz (née Zorn)
 Léo Legrand as young Thomas Verniaz
 Évelyne Didi as Yvette
 Lionel Abelanski as Godin
  as Catherine
 Tania Garbarski as Nelly

Accolades

References

External links 

2010 films
2010 fantasy films
Belgian fantasy films
Films about time travel
Films shot in France
Films shot in Luxembourg
French fantasy films
2010s French-language films
German fantasy films
Live-action films based on manga
Luxembourgian fantasy films
French-language Luxembourgian films
2010s French films
2010s German films